Dennis Taylor (12 June 1921 in Sidcup, Kent – 2 June 1962 in Monte Carlo, Monaco) was a British racing driver from England. He competed in 500cc Formula 3 from 1952 to 1954. His single World Championship Formula One entry was at the 1959 British Grand Prix driving his Formula 2 Lotus 12, and he failed to qualify.

He was killed in the Formula Junior race at Monte Carlo in 1962, 10 days before his 41st birthday.

Racing record

Complete Formula One World Championship results
(key)

Complete British Saloon Car Championship results
(key) (Races in bold indicate pole position; races in italics indicate fastest lap.)

References

External links
Dennis Taylor profile at The 500 Owners Association

English racing drivers
English Formula One drivers
English expatriates in Monaco
Racing drivers who died while racing
1921 births
1962 deaths
Sport deaths in Monaco
People from Sidcup
British Touring Car Championship drivers